Ramna Maidan, located in Arrah, Bhojpur District, Bihar, the one of the largest urban parks in Arrah It is spread across 60 acres of land.

References

External links

Sports venues in Bihar
Cricket grounds in Bihar
Football venues in Bihar
1850s establishments in India
Sports venues completed in the 1850s